The 2016–17 season is Levski Sofia's 96th season in the First League. This article shows player statistics and all matches (official and friendly) that the club has played during the 2016–17 season.

Transfers

In

Out

Loans out

Squad

Updated on 4 May 2017.

Fixtures

Friendlies

Summer

Mid-season

Winter

Parva Liga

Preliminary stage

League table

Results summary

Results by round

Matches

Championship stage

League table

Results summary

Results by round

Results

European play-off final

Bulgarian Cup

UEFA Europa League

Second qualifying round

Squad statistics

|-
|colspan="14"|Players away from the club on loan:

|-
|colspan="14"|Players who left Levski (Sofia) during the season:

|}

References

PFC Levski Sofia seasons
Levski Sofia